The Nursing and Midwifery Council of Ghana (N&MC) is the regulatory body that monitors, enlists and regulates the activities of nurses and midwives in Ghana. The body is also responsible for the examination of student nurses and midwives that leads to the award of their professional licensing. The  mandate of the council is derived from the Part III of the Health Professions Regulatory Bodies Act, 2013 (Act 857). The Registrar for the council is Felix Nyante.

References

 
Professional associations based in Ghana